The 1977 Victorian Football League Night Series was the 17th edition of the VFL Night Series, a VFL-organised national club Australian rules football tournament between the clubs from the VFL.

The 1977 Series would be the first night series to be played since 1971 but unlike the previous version that had been run between 1956 and 1971 as a consolation tournament that featuring the eight teams that missed the VFL finals and was played in September & October. This version was to feature all 12 VFL clubs and was played mid-week throughout the VFL premiership season between May & August.

Qualified Teams

Venues

Knockout stage

Round 1

Quarter-finals

Semi-finals

Victorian Football League Night Series final

References

Australian rules interstate football
History of Australian rules football
Australian rules football competitions in Australia
1977 in Australian rules football